John Reeve (born November 7, 1937) is a bobsledder who represented the United States Virgin Islands. He competed in the two man event at the 1988 Winter Olympics.

References

External links
 

1937 births
Living people
United States Virgin Islands male bobsledders
Olympic bobsledders of the United States Virgin Islands
Bobsledders at the 1988 Winter Olympics
Place of birth missing (living people)